Marat Vyacheslavovich Bystrov (born 19 June 1992) is a Kazakhstani football player who plays for Akhmat Grozny.

Club career
Bystrov made his professional debut in the Russian Professional Football League for FC Chelyabinsk on 18 July 2014 in a game against FC Neftekhimik Nizhnekamsk.

On 25 June 2018, Bystrov signed a 3-year contract with FC Astana and was immediately loaned to FC Tobol until the end of 2018.

On 14 January 2019, Bystrov moved to FC Ordabasy on loan, returning to Astana in January 2020. 

On 16 August 2020, Akhmat Grozny announced the signing of Bystrov to a two-year contract.

International
On 21 February 2019, he made his debut for the Kazakhstan national football team in a friendly against Moldova.

Personal
His father is Russian and his mother Kazakhstani. From 2012 to 2014 he made a break in his soccer career to serve in the Russian army.

Career statistics

Club

International

References

External links
 

1992 births
People from Kostanay Region
Kazakhstani people of Russian descent
Living people
Kazakhstani footballers
Kazakhstan international footballers
Association football defenders
FC Tambov players
FC Tobol players
FC Ordabasy players
FC Akhmat Grozny players
Russian Second League players
Russian First League players
Russian Premier League players
Kazakhstan Premier League players